The Museum of King John III's Palace at Wilanów is a museum in Warsaw, Poland considered to be one of the oldest in the country and the repository of the country's royal and artistic heritage. The collection consists of valuables collected by subsequent owners of the Wilanów Palace, the Kings of Poland — John III Sobieski and Augustus II, as well as by representatives of noble families of Potocki, and Lubomirski and a collection of Sarmatian art.

History
The Wilanów Palace was first opened to the public in 1805, when the owners of the Palace, Stanisław Kostka Potocki and his wife Aleksandra Lubomirska created a museum, one of the first public museums in Poland. In 1877 the museum was popularized by the publication entitled Wilanów. Album widoków i pamiątek... edited by Hipolit Skimborowicz and Wojciech Gerson.  This was followed in 1893 by a guide over the Palace and its collections.

After the Second World War, the palace was renovated, and most of the collection, which had been stolen by Nazi Germany, was repatriated. Under the Communist agrarian reform, the Wilanów estate became the property of the state. In 1954 the extensive revitalization palace and the park began in 1962 with the opening of the museum as a branch of the National Museum in Warsaw. In following years the number of visitors to the palace and gardens reached 400,000 people per year. In 1983, on the occasion of the 300th anniversary of the Battle of Vienna, the museum organized a jubilee exhibition "Glory and fame of John III in art and literature". In 1995 the Palace Museum was established as an independent entity under the Ministry of Culture and National Heritage.

The Museum regularly organizes temporary exhibitions, conferences and seminars, conducts research, publishes books and organizes educational activities dedicated to both cultural and natural values of the Wilanów residence. In September 2013 the museum was renamed as the Museum of King John III's Palace at Wilanów.

Collection
The palace's collection started with its establishment by King John III Sobieski, who collected works of art and objects of everyday use. Only a fraction of King's collection survived to this day in the museum's current holdings, including two still life paintings by Abraham Mignon, portrait paintings and furnishings like Chinese quilt of Kings' wife Marysieńka. Originally the Royal belongings included 6 paintings by Rembrandt and Johannes Vermeer's Loveletter, scattered after King's death. The subsequent owners re-estabslished and enriched the collection with paintings by Lucas Cranach the Elder, Peter Paul Rubens, Jan Lievens, Charles Le Brun, Pompeo Batoni, Angelika Kauffmann and Anton Graff, among others. The Equestrian Portrait of Stanisław Kostka Potocki, painted in 1781 by Jacques-Louis David, is among the most precious paintings of the collection. The acquisitions also included examples of European and Polish goldsmithery (e.g. Decorative platter by Hans Jacob Mair), biscuits, craft, objects from the Far East (e.g. Japanese nanban table adorned with mother-of-pearl), antiquities (e.g. Red — figure amphora by the Painter of the Louvre Gigantomachia and marble bust of a prince of the Julio-Claudian dynasty) and Royal memorabilia (e.g. dressing table of Queen Marysieńka).

Collection highlights

Painting

Sculpture and Applied arts

See also
 Poster Museum at Wilanów

Notes

External links
 Website
King John III Palace Museum, Wilanów within Google Arts & Culture

Museums in Warsaw
Museums established in 1805
Museums established in 1995
Historic house museums in Poland
Art museums and galleries in Poland
Registered museums in Poland
1805 establishments in Prussia